Bartels is a lunar impact crater located along the western perimeter of the Moon's visible face. At this location the crater is viewed from the side, and visibility is affected by libration. The crater can be viewed in its entirety only from lunar orbit. It is located to the north of the crater Moseley and south-southeast of Voskresenskiy.

The rim of this crater is worn and eroded, particularly along the southern face and in the northeast where a small crater overlies the rim. The interior floor forms a nearly plain except for a tiny central peak offset to the west of the midpoint, and is marked by a number of tiny craterlets.

Satellite craters
By convention these features are identified on lunar maps by placing the letter on the side of the crater midpoint that is closest to Bartels.

References

External links
 

Impact craters on the Moon